"I'm Knee Deep in Loving You" is a song written by Sonny Throckmorton. It was first recorded by Jim Mundy, whose version reached No. 86 on the Hot Country Songs charts in 1976.

It was later recorded by American country music group Dave & Sugar.  It was released in October 1977 as the second single from the album That's the Way Love Should Be. Their version of the song reached number 2 on the Billboard Hot Country Singles & Tracks chart.

Chart performance

References

1977 singles
Dave & Sugar songs
Songs written by Sonny Throckmorton
RCA Records singles
1977 songs